Onthophilinae is a subfamily of clown beetles in the family Histeridae. There are about 8 genera and at least 80 described species in Onthophilinae.

Genera
These eight genera belong to the subfamily Onthophilinae:
 Cretonthophilus Caterino, Wolf-Schwenninger and Bechly, 2015 (Cretaceous (Early Cenomanian); Myanmar)
 Epiechinus Lewis, 1891
 Glymma Marseul, 1856
 Onthophilus Leach, 1817
 Peploglyptus J. L. LeConte, 1880
 Sculptura Thérond, 1969
 Sigillum Thérond, 1975
 Vuattuoxinus Thérond, 1964

References

Further reading

External links

 

Histeridae
Articles created by Qbugbot